Dubai-Sharjah-Ajman (DSA) is a metropolitan area in the United Arab Emirates. It consists of the combined urban areas of Dubai, Ajman, and Sharjah. The urban areas at the northeast end of Dubai flow into those of Sharjah, which in turn are contiguous with those of Ajman. The total population is about 5.64 million people as of 2021.

See also
 Abu Dhabi Metropolitan Area
 Dammam-Dhahran-Khobar metropolitan area in Saudi Arabia

References

Metropolitan areas of the United Arab Emirates